Events from the year 1632 in Sweden.

Incumbents
 Monarch – Gustaf II Adolf then Christina

Events

 Foundation of the Rudbeckii flickskola, the first school for girls.
 March – Thirty Years' War – Gustaf II Adolf of Sweden, invades Bavaria with his army.
 April 15 – Thirty Years' War – Gustaf II Adolf defeats Tilly for the second time within a year at the Battle of Rain. Tilly is severely wounded during the battle.
 May – Thirty Years' War – Munich, capital of Bavaria, is captured by the Swedish army.
 September 9 – Thirty Years' War – Besieged by Wallenstein at Nuremberg, Swedish king Gustavus Adolphus attempts to break the siege, but is defeated in the Battle of the Alte Veste.
 October 15 – Official opening of the University of Tartu in Swedish Livonia.
 November 16 – Thirty Years' War – Battle of Lützen – Swedish king Gustaf II Adolf leads an assault on Wallenstein's army, but is killed early in the battle. Despite the king's death, the Swedish commanders manage to rally the army and eventually defeat Wallenstein's army. As a result, Wallenstein withdraws from Saxony.
 Following the death of Gustaf II Adolf, king of Sweden, he is succeeded by his 6-year-old daughter Christina while five regents, headed by Axel Oxenstierna, govern the country since she is underage.
 Catharina Stopia is appointed to succeed her deceased spouse as Sweden's ambassador to Russia, and becomes the first female diplomat of her country.

Births

 29 January – Elsa Elisabeth Brahe, princess   (died 1689) 
 16 December – Erik Benzelius the Elder, theologian and archbishop   (died 1709)

Deaths

November 16 – Gustav II Adolf, King of Sweden (died 1632)

References

 
Years of the 17th century in Sweden
Sweden